The People's Front was the British Columbian section of the Communist Party of Canada (Marxist–Leninist). The leader of the People's Front was Charles Boylan.

In the 2001 British Columbia election, it nominated 11 candidates, received a total of 720 votes (0.34% of the vote in the ridings in which they ran, and 0.05% of the province-wide vote). The PF candidates ran last in all but one of 11 ridings, and no candidate won more than 1% of the popular vote.

The party nominated five candidates for the 2005 election. They won a total of 383 votes (0.02% of the province-wide vote).

After failing to run any candidates in the 2013 and 2017 general elections, the party was deregistered on May 31, 2017.

Election results 

Source:

Finances

References 

Communist Party of Canada (Marxist–Leninist)
Anti-revisionist organizations
Provincial political parties in British Columbia
Port Moody
2017 disestablishments in British Columbia
Political parties disestablished in 2017